Dinckleria is a small genus of liverworts in the order Jungermanniales, containing only three species. It is mainly distributed around Oceania.

Species in Dinckleria 
Dinckleria fruticella 
Dinckleria pleurata 
Dinckleria singularis

References

Jungermanniales
Jungermanniales genera
Plants described in 1877
Taxa named by Vittore Benedetto Antonio Trevisan de Saint-Léon
Flora of New Zealand
Flora of Tasmania